Andrei Aleksandrovich Vasilevski (born 28 May 1991) is a Belarusian professional tennis player. He has a career-high doubles ranking of World No. 52 achieved on 5 February 2018. He is currently the No. 1 Belarusian doubles player.
Vasilevski has competed for the Belarus Davis Cup team since 2009.

Professional career

2017
Vasilevski finished as runner-up, partnering Hans Podlipnik Castillo in the doubles competition of the 2017 Generali Open Kitzbühel, losing to 4th seeded pair of Pablo Cuevas and Guillermo Durán.

Three weeks earlier in July, the pair also reached the quarterfinals of a Grand Slam at the 2017 Wimbledon Championships for the first time in their career defeating seeds No. 12 Juan Sebastián Cabal and Robert Farah and seeds No. 7 Raven Klaasen and Rajeev Ram en route.

2020-2021: Maiden ATP doubles title
Vasilevski won his maiden doubles title on his 30th birthday at the 2021 Belgrade Open partnering Jonathan Erlich who won his 22nd title. He also reached three other finals with Erlich at the 2021 Open Sud de France in Montpellier losing to the top seeded pair Kontinen/Roger-Vasselin, at the 2021 Astana Open in Nur-Sultan and in 2020 at the Maharashtra Open in Pune.

ATP career finals

Doubles: 5 (1 title, 4 runners-up)

Challenger and Futures Finals

Singles: 1 (1–0)

Doubles: 75 (41–34)

References

External links
 
 
 

1991 births
Living people
Belarusian male tennis players
Universiade medalists in tennis
Universiade gold medalists for Belarus
Medalists at the 2013 Summer Universiade
Medalists at the 2015 Summer Universiade
Tennis players from Minsk
21st-century Belarusian people